is the third season a part of Japanese anime television series Bakugan Battle Brawlers. It has 39 episodes in length total, and is produced by TMS Entertainment and Maxpire Entertainment, which replaced Japan Vistec, which is in charge in animation in the last two seasons. The series premiered in Canada on May 23, 2010, and in the United States on May 29, 2010. This season ended on January 29, 2011 and is followed by a fourth season.
In Japan it premieres on April 3, 2011, taking over the time slot of LilPri at 9:00 AM.


Episode list

References

External links
 TV Tokyo's Bakugan: Gundalian Invaders website 
 Nelvana's Bakugan: Gundalian Invaders website 

2010 Japanese television seasons
2011 Japanese television seasons
Gundalian Invaders
2010 Canadian television seasons
2011 Canadian television seasons